Tomas Žiukas (born 2 December 1970) is a Lithuanian international footballer that play as in defense as a full-back. He played most prominently for FK Žalgiris Vilnius and Kareda Šiauliai.

International career
Žiukas made 45 appearances for the Lithuania national football team between 1992 and 1998.

References

 

1970 births
Living people
Lithuanian footballers
FC Metallurg Lipetsk players
Lithuania international footballers
FK Žalgiris players
FK Kareda Kaunas players
Association football defenders